When It's Time to Fall in Love Again is a studio album by American recording artist Wanda Jackson. It was released in 1974 via Myrrh Records and contained ten tracks. It was the first collection of country music recordings released following Jackson's departure from Capitol Records in 1973 and was her twenty-second album in her career. The project included two singles. The second single, "Come on Home (To This Lonely Heart)", made chart positions on the American country songs survey in 1974.

Background and content
Wanda Jackson had previously been known for her commercially successful Rockabilly and country music recordings, including "Let's Have a Party" (1960), "In the Middle of a Heartache" (1961) and "Tears Will Be the Chaser for Your Wine" (1967). After discovering Christianity in 1971, she left her long-time label home (Capitol Records) to pursue religious music. In 1973, she made her first recordings for Word Records. Shortly after her signing, Word announced its label subsidiary titled Myrrh Records. According to Jackson's autobiography, it was agreed that Word would release her religious material, while Myrrh would release her country material. This agreement led to recordings that would comprise When It's Time to Fall in Love Again.

Jackson went into the Jack Clement Studio in April 1973 with producer Billy Ray Hearn to record the album's tracks. A total of ten recordings were chosen for the album. The record was a collection of country songs that mixed originals with covers of previously-recorded songs. The title track and "Come on Home (To This Lonely Heart)" were among the project's original songs. Meanwhile, Donna Fargo's "Funny Face", Jean Shepard's "Slippin' Away" and Anne Murray's "Snowbird" were covers.

Release and singles
When It's Time to Fall in Love Again was released in 1974 on Myrrh Records. The album was Jackson's twenty second studio release in her career and her first country album following her Capitol Records departure. The album was originally issued as a vinyl LP, containing five songs on either side of the record. Two singles were issued from the record. The first to be released was the title track, which Myrrh distributed to radio stations in September 1973. This was followed by "Come on Home (To This Lonely Heart)", which was released on Myrrh in December 1973. The song spent a total of four weeks on the Billboard Hot Country Singles chart, peaking at number 98 in February 1974. "Come on Home" is Jackson's last Billboard charting single to date.

Track listing

Personnel
All credits are adapted from the liner notes of When It's Time to Fall in Love Again.

Musical personnel
 Joseph Babcock – Background vocals
 Jerry Carrigan – Drums
 Ray Edenton – Guitar
 Dolores Edgin – Background vocals
 Wanda Jackson – Lead vocals
 Weldon Myrick – Steel guitar
 June Page – Background vocals
 Billy Sanford – Guitar
 Jerry Shook – Guitar
 Jerry Smith – Piano
 Hurshel Wiginton – Background vocals
 Jack Williams – Guitar

Technical personnel
 Dick Cobb – Photography
 Billy Ray Hearn – Producer
 Farrell Morris – Percussion
 Charlie Tallent – Engineer

Release history

References

1974 albums
Wanda Jackson albums